Oliveri (Sicilian: Oluveri) is a comune (municipality) in the Province of Messina in the Italian region Sicily, located about  east of Palermo and about  west of Messina.

Oliveri borders the following municipalities: Falcone, Montalbano Elicona, Patti.

Public transport

Railways 
Oliveri railway station is on the Palermo–Messina railway. It is served by trains run by Trenitalia, including services from Messina.

Bus and tram 
Oliveri is served by bus provided from Azienda Siciliana Trasporti.

Demographic evolution

References

Cities and towns in Sicily